Amou may refer to:

 Amou, Benin
 Amou, Landes, France
 Amou Prefecture, Togo

See also
 Australian Maritime Officers Union